Ravina is a national historic district located at Lordville, a hamlet in the Town of Hancock in Delaware County, New York. The district contains six contributing buildings, one contributing site, and two contributing structures.  It encompasses a small rural estate consisting of the main house, guest bungalow, garage, caretakers' dwelling, wood shed, and distinctive landscape features. The main residence is a three-by-three-bay, 2-story wood-frame building listed in the Sears catalog of prefabricated houses as "Shadow Lawn."  It and the bungalow were built in 1926–1927.

It was listed on the National Register of Historic Places in 2000.

See also
National Register of Historic Places listings in Delaware County, New York

References

National Register of Historic Places in Delaware County, New York
Historic districts on the National Register of Historic Places in New York (state)
Historic districts in Delaware County, New York
Houses completed in 1926
1926 establishments in New York (state)
Bungalow architecture in New York (state)
American Craftsman architecture in New York (state)
Sears Modern Homes